Plaški is a village and a municipality in Karlovac County, Croatia. It is part of Lika.

Geography 
Plaški is situated in the lower part of the Ogulin-Plaški valley. Together with Gorski kotar and Lika, the Ogulin-Plaški valley forms Mountainous Croatia.  The town of Plaški is situated 28 km south from Ogulin and shares borders with municipalities of Ogulin, Josipdol and Saborsko.

Municipality

The municipality consists of several settlements:

 Janja Gora, population 112
 Jezero, population 77
 Kunić, population 32
 Lapat, population 215
 Latin, population 196
 Međeđak, population 100
 Plaški, population 1,281
 Pothum Plaščanski, population 77

History 
In year 33 B.C. the Romans, led by the future Emperor Octavian Augustus, won the battle against an Illyrian tribe, the Japods, in the area east of Plaški. Roman coins have been found in Plaški which proves that this region was inhabited in Roman times.

The name Plaški was first mentioned in 1163 in documents of the Split diocese of the Roman Catholic Church.  The second mention dates from 1185 and relates to the establishment of new Krbava diocese, which the parish of Plaški became a part of.  Plaški county (Comitatus Plazy) was a separate administrative region until 1193, when it became part of Modruš county and came to be owned by the Frankopan family.  In the name of Frankopans Plaški was governed by the Zebić family of nobles, who were their loyal vassals (even today a part of Plaški is called Zebići).

In 1492 just before the Battle of Krbava Plaški was raided by the Turks led by Jakub-Paša and Plaški was abandoned.  In a document of Bernardin Frankopan from 1500 Plaški is described as defense fort against the Turks. Another document from 1550 confirms Plaški's status as defense fort and also mentions it as one of four centres in the Military Frontier of the Habsburg Empire.

By decision of the Military Council in Graz, Serbs were allowed to resettle the area. The Serbs came in three waves: 1609, 1639 and 1666.  Together with Tounj, Plaški was centre of a military company that was part of Ogulin's regiment.  The Eparchy of Upper Karlovac of the Serbian Orthodox Church was founded in 1711 and had its first seat in Gomirje monastery and from 1721 to 1941 the seat was in Plaški. The Orthodox Cathedral was built from 1756 to 1763.

Demographics 
Before the Croatian War of Independence, Plaški was a municipality with a majority of Serb population.  In the census of 2001, the town of Plaški had 1,468 with total municipality population of 2,292, of which 48.4% were Croats, and 46.1% Serbs. Much of the Croat population is made up of those forced to leave Bosnia replacing Serbs who, in 1995, fled during the war Operation Storm.  The Serbs constituted 46% and Croats constituted 51% of the population in the 2011 census.

People
Omar Pasha (born Mihajlo Latas, 1806–1871), Ottoman general and governor
Peter Kokotowitsch (8 October 1890 – 12 July 1968) Wrestler – competed as a middleweight at the 1912 Summer Olympics

References

Further reading

 

Municipalities of Croatia
Populated places in Karlovac County
Serb communities in Croatia